Vajira Abeywardana (born 2 September 1960) is a Sri Lankan United National Party politician and a member of parliament for Galle District. He is the current cabinet Minister of Home Affairs.

Abeywardana also previously served as Minister of Public Administration, Management and Reforms in the UNP government led by Ranil Wickramasinghe in 2001. Vajira Abeywardana was educated at Mahinda College, Galle and University of Moratuwa. He resides in Kappetipola Mawatha, Colombo.

References

1960 births
Living people
Sri Lankan Buddhists
Members of the 10th Parliament of Sri Lanka
Members of the 11th Parliament of Sri Lanka
Members of the 12th Parliament of Sri Lanka
Members of the 13th Parliament of Sri Lanka
Members of the 15th Parliament of Sri Lanka
Government ministers of Sri Lanka
Home affairs ministers of Sri Lanka
United National Party politicians
Alumni of Mahinda College
Sinhalese politicians